Mara Lane (born Dorothy Bolton; 1 August 1930) is a British-Austrian actress. She appeared in more than 30 films from 1951 to 1965.

Early life
Lane was born in Vienna, Austria. She is the eldest daughter of Russian-born pianist mother Olga Mironova and English father Briton John Bolton, who worked for an American oil firm; he later died in a car crash in the U.S. Her youngest sister is the actress Jocelyn Lane.

Lane's high school education came in New York, and she attended Marguerite Bourgeois College in Montreal, Canada.

Selected filmography

References

External links 

1930 births
Living people
Austrian film actresses